Mission to Mars is a 2000 science fiction film directed by Brian De Palma.

Mission to Mars may also refer to:

Space missions
 Exploration of Mars, the study of Mars by spacecraft, beginning in the late 20th century
 List of missions to Mars
 Human mission to Mars (crewed  manned)

Other uses
 Mission to Mars (attraction), a former attraction at Walt Disney theme parks
 Mission to Mars (novel), a novel by Patrick Moore
 "Mission to Mars", a 2006 episode of The Backyardigans
 Mission to Mars: My Vision for Space Exploration, a 2013 book by astronaut Buzz Aldrin and Leonard David
 "Mission to Mars", a song by thrash metal band Megadeth from the 2022 album The Sick, the Dying... and the Dead!

See also

 Mars mission (disambiguation)